Lizaveta Kuzmenka (born 18 April 1987) is an alpine skier from Belarus.  She competed for Belarus at the 2010 Winter Olympics.  Her best result was a 54th place in the giant slalom.

References

External links
 
 

1987 births
Alpine skiers at the 2010 Winter Olympics
Belarusian female alpine skiers
Living people
Olympic alpine skiers of Belarus